Protogeneia (minor planet designation: 147 Protogenia) is a large main belt asteroid that was discovered by Hungarian astronomer Lipót Schulhof on July 10, 1875, from the Vienna Observatory; it was his only asteroid discovery. Its name is Greek for "first born" and was chosen by Karl L. Littrow in allusion to the fact that this was the first asteroid discovered by an astronomer who was already known for work in other fields of astronomy.

This object has a low orbital eccentricity and inclination. With an orbital period roughly double that of the planet Jupiter, it has been identified as a member of the Hecuba group of asteroids that share a 2:1 mean-motion orbital resonance with the giant planet. Based upon its spectrum, it has a Tholen classification as a C-type asteroid, which indicates that it has a dark surface and probably a primitive composition of carbonaceous material.

Photometric observations of this asteroid at the Altimira Observatory in 2004 gave a light curve with a period of 7.8528 ± 0.0008 hours and a brightness variation of 0.28 in magnitude. A photometric study was reported in 2006 from the Yunnan Observatory in China, finding a matching period of 7.852 hours and a brightness variation of 0.25 magnitude. They estimate the ratio of the lengths for the asteroid's major and minor axes is at least 1.26:1.

There is one reported stellar occultation by Protogeneia, on May 28, 2002, from Texas.

References

External links 
 
 

000147
Discoveries by Lipót Schulhof
Named minor planets
000147
000147
000147
18750710